Saint-Pascal is a city in Kamouraska Regional County Municipality in the Bas-Saint-Laurent region of Quebec.

Demographics 

Government 
 Mayor: Cécile Joseph
 Councillors: Renald Bernier, Daniel Drapeau, Claude Lavoie, Rémi Pelletier, Francine Soucy, Yvan Soucy

Notable people 

 Annie St-Pierre, film director and producer

See also
 List of cities in Quebec

References

External links
 

Cities and towns in Quebec
Incorporated places in Bas-Saint-Laurent